In Riemannian geometry, a Jacobi field is a vector field along a geodesic  in a Riemannian manifold describing the difference between the geodesic and an "infinitesimally close" geodesic. In other words, the Jacobi fields along a geodesic form the tangent space to the geodesic in the space of all geodesics. They are named after Carl Jacobi.

Definitions and properties

is a Jacobi field, and describes the behavior of the geodesics in an infinitesimal neighborhood of a 
given geodesic .

A vector field J along a geodesic  is said to be a Jacobi field if it satisfies the Jacobi equation:

where D denotes the covariant derivative with respect to the Levi-Civita connection, R the Riemann curvature tensor,  the tangent vector field, and t is the parameter of the geodesic.
On a complete Riemannian manifold, for any Jacobi field there is a family of geodesics  describing the field (as in the preceding paragraph).

The Jacobi equation is a linear, second order ordinary differential equation;
Furthermore, the set of Jacobi fields along a given geodesic forms a real vector space of dimension twice the dimension of the manifold.

Motivating example

On a unit sphere, the geodesics through the North pole are great circles. The geodesic distance 
 
is 
 
Computing this requires knowing the geodesics. The most interesting information is just that
, for any . 
 
Notice further that to calculate this derivative we do not actually need to know 
, 
rather, all we need do is solve the equation 
, 
for some given initial data. 

Jacobi fields give a natural generalization of this phenomenon to arbitrary Riemannian manifolds.

Solving the Jacobi equation

Parallel transport it to get a basis  all along . 
 
and the Jacobi equation can be rewritten as a system
 
for each . This way we get a linear ordinary differential equation (ODE). 

Examples
The restriction of a Killing vector field to a geodesic is a Jacobi field in any Riemannian manifold.

See also
 Conjugate points
 Geodesic deviation equation
 Rauch comparison theorem
 N-Jacobi field

References
 Manfredo Perdigão do Carmo. Riemannian geometry. Translated from the second Portuguese edition by Francis Flaherty. Mathematics: Theory & Applications. Birkhäuser Boston, Inc., Boston, MA, 1992. xiv+300 pp. 
 Jeff Cheeger and David G. Ebin. Comparison theorems in Riemannian geometry. Revised reprint of the 1975 original. AMS Chelsea Publishing, Providence, RI, 2008. x+168 pp. 
 Shoshichi Kobayashi and Katsumi Nomizu. Foundations of differential geometry. Vol. II. Reprint of the 1969 original. Wiley Classics Library. A Wiley-Interscience Publication. John Wiley & Sons, Inc., New York, 1996. xvi+468 pp. 
 Barrett O'Neill. Semi-Riemannian geometry. With applications to relativity. Pure and Applied Mathematics, 103. Academic Press, Inc. [Harcourt Brace Jovanovich, Publishers], New York, 1983. xiii+468 pp. 

Riemannian geometry
Equations